Dimestore: A Writer's Life is a memoir by Lee Smith about her childhood in Grundy, Virginia. It was the first book written by Grundy that was not fiction.

Reception
Terri Schlichenmeyer of The Pantagraph wrote that it is "a pretty darn good book" and has appeal to multiple audiences.

Publishers Weekly wrote that Smith had "candid observations".

Kirkus Reviews stated it is "A warm, poignant memoir from a reliably smooth voice."

References

External links
Dimestore - Lee Smith official website

2015 non-fiction books
American memoirs
Buchanan County, Virginia
Algonquin Books books